Porin Karhu Hockey Team, or simply just Karhu HT (abbreviated KHT) was an ice hockey team in Pori, Finland.

History

Time in the 2nd Division (2007–2015)

2011–2012 
Karhu HT's 2011–2012 season in the 2nd Division went well. KHT finished 1st in their division with 25 points and went to the Suomi-sarja qualification playoffs. Karhu HT didn't succeed in getting promoted to Suomi-sarja though.

Promotion to Suomi-sarja (2015–present) 
Karhu HT got promoted to Suomi-sarja after the 2014–15 season.

First Suomi-sarja season (2015–2016) 
In its first Suomi-sarja season, Karhu HT finished third in the regular season, but got swept by JHT Kalajoki in the first round of the playoffs. Karhu HT's goalie, Niklas Lehti, had the 2nd best save precentage in the league, if only players who played atleast 1/3 of the games.

Suomi-sarja championship (2020–2021) 
Karhu HT finished fifth in the regular season. KHT beat Haukat in the finals after two games. This was Karhu HT's first Suomi-sarja championship. Karhu HT's player budget was estimated to be 35 000€ by Satakunnan Kansa.

The End (2022-2023) 
In 2022, Karhu HT gave up their spot in Suomi-sarja after they had gotten 0 points in 13 games.

League history 
Leagues Karhu HT has played in:
 4. divisioona (2000–2001)
 2. divisioona (2007–2015)
 Suomi-sarja (2015–2022)

Logo history 

The current logo of Karhu HT was used from 2000 to 2007 and was taken into use again in 2019. Karhu HT also uses the logo of KK-V, since their hockey teams merged in 2018 when KK-V gave up their spot on the 2. divisioona.

Franchise records 
These are the top-five-point-scorers in franchise history. Figures are updated after each completed season.

  – current Karhu HT player

Note: Pos = Position; GP = Games Played; G = Goals; A = Assists; Pts = Points

Notable players 
Players are considered notable if they fit the criteria of WP:Nhockey, or have played a game in a top-league of a country. Not counting loan players.
 Teemu Vuorisalo (2019 Suomen cup, 2022)
 Kasperi Nuto (2017-2022)
 Kasperi Kotkaniemi (2020-21, 2022)
 Julius Harttunen (2019-2022)
 Atte Valli  (2015-2022)

Other sports 
Karhu HT hasn't had any teams in other sports than ice hockey, but Karhu HT and MuSa, a local football club, have hosted football tournaments and other events together.

Sources 

Ice hockey teams in Finland
Ässät 
Ice hockey clubs established in 2000
2000 establishments in Finland
Sport in Pori
Suomi-sarja teams
Sport in Satakunta